The Welsh Grey or Old Welsh Grey was a breed of sheepdog native to Wales. It is probably now extinct.

Description
Welsh Greys were shaggy, long-haired dogs, similar in appearance to working strains of the Scottish Bearded Collie or to the ancestors of the Old English Sheepdog, and the breeds probably have a common heritage.

As a working dog
Like the Bearded Collie, the Welsh Grey worked in a "loose-eyed", noisy manner very different from the Border and other collie types, with a distinctive short bark. As well as being used by shepherds, the breed was also popular with the drovers who took livestock to England.

Decline and extinction
All types of Welsh sheepdog declined in numbers from the early 20th century due to the increasing use of the Border Collie for herding. Dogs of the Welsh Grey breed were still found on Welsh hill farms in the upper Towy valley as late as the 1980s, but the breed is likely now extinct.

Diffusion of breed
Specimens of the Welsh Grey are thought to have accompanied Welsh settlers to Patagonia and the Patagonian Sheepdog is in part a descendant from this breed.

External links

National Purebred Dog Day The Old Welsh Grey – a Beardie Ancestor?
The Border Collie Museum Extinct Types in Wales
ResearchGate Schematic representation of how Old Welsh Grey and other old UK herding dogs arrived in the regions of Aysén and Magallanes, Chile from the United Kingdom (mainly England, Scotland, and Wales) between 1877 and 1910

References

Dog breeds originating in Wales
Herding dogs
Extinct dog breeds